Baguley Cars Ltd (later Baguley (Engineers) Ltd, then E. E. Baguley Ltd)  was a British engineering company, specialising in railway locomotives. it was founded in 1911 by Ernest E. Baguley and subsequently acquired by Drewry Car Co to form Baguley-Drewry in 1964.

Baguley Cars Ltd. 

In 1911, engineer Ernest E. Baguley set up Baguley Cars Ltd, taking over the assets of the (then defunct) Ryknield Motor Company at Shobnall Road Works, Burton-on-Trent.  The company produced a range of motor vehicles.

In 1912, Baguely entered into an agreement with the Drewry Car Co. to manufacture railcars for Drewry from 1912. The same year, Baguley acquired the stock, order books, designs and patents of McEwan Pratt, which was in liquidation. Baguley formed a new subsidiary - McEwan Pratt (1912) Ltd - to fulfill existing orders. Leonard Bentall, the McEwan Pratt draughtsman, became the chief draughtsman of Baguley and led the design of future Baguley and McEwan Pratt locomotives, which shared many common features. Robert McEwan also joined Baguley, where he worked until 1921.

The company did not follow the 'normal' practice of building steam first and then diesel or petrol, but started in the opposite fashion, not building their first steam rail engine until 1919. But even this was almost an 'accident', as the locomotive was intended to be a petrol hydraulic machine but the transmission components were held up because of the 1914 - 18 war, so it was converted to a steam engine. Altogether the company built some 31 steam locos.

Baguley (Engineers) Ltd

After the War there was a decline in the production of road vehicles (probably due to competition from other manufacturers) and an increase in the production of railway equipment.  Because of this, the name of the company was changed from Baguley Cars Ltd to Baguley (Engineers) Ltd on 10 April 1923. Despite the formal name change, the company continued to use the Baguley Cars Ltd. name for several more years. W.E.C. Souster took over as managing director of the company, having worked his way up from office boy.

During the 1920s there was some friction because Drewry complained that Baguley was failing to produce more modern designs of engine and chassis.  Drewry began to move their business to the English Electric Company.  Baguley (Engineers) Ltd went into decline and entered liquidation in 1931.  Most of the plant and effects were sold at auction on 10 November 1931.

E. E. Baguley Ltd

W.E.C Souster and his brother Frederick C. Souster, revived the company shortly after its liquidation with W.E.C serving as chairman and the brothers as co-managing directors. The new company was called E. E. Baguley Ltd. and was located at Clarence Street, Burton-on-Trent; it was registered on 30 April 1932. Initially the company was a repair business for Baguley products, but it soon expanded into locomotive production. In 1934 E. E. Baguley Ltd. moved to larger premises at Uxbridge Street, Burton-on-Trent.  This company survived until January 1964, when it was acquired by Drewry Cars Ltd to form Baguley-Drewry Ltd.

Preserved locomotives

The following Baguley locomotives are known to have been preserved:

References

Sources 
 
 

Locomotive manufacturers of the United Kingdom
Defunct motor vehicle manufacturers of England
Engineering companies of the United Kingdom